Henry Munro may refer to:

Henry Munro (Canada West politician) (1802–1874), farmer and political figure in Canada West
Henry Munro Middle School, Ottawa, Canada, named after the above
Henry M. Munro (1840–1915), farmer and political figure in Nova Scotia, Canada
Henry Munro (United Irishman) (1758–1798)
Henry Munro (loyalist) (1730–1801), British Army chaplain and missionary to the Mohawk people

See also
Henry Munroe (c. 1727–c. 1782), Scottish-born soldier and political figure in Nova Scotia
Henry Smith Munroe (1850–1933), American geologist
Sir Harry Munro, 7th Baronet (1720–1781)
Henry Monro (1791–1814), British painter
Henry Monroe (born 1956), defensive back in the National Football League
Henry Munro-Butler-Johnstone (1837–1902), British author and politician
Harry Monroe, a fictional character in My Name is Earl